Tetratheca virgata is a species of plant in the quandong family that is endemic to Australia.

Description
The species grows as a slender, spreading shrub to 10–45 cm in height. The pink-purple flowers appear from September to November.

Distribution and habitat
The species occurs within the Avon Wheatbelt and Jarrah Forest IBRA bioregions of south-west Western Australia. The plants grow on sandy, gravelly and clay soils.

References

virgata
Eudicots of Western Australia
Oxalidales of Australia
Taxa named by Joachim Steetz
Plants described in 1845